Samuel L. Jackson is an American actor and film producer. A prolific actor, Jackson's films have collectively grossed over $27 billion, making him the highest-grossing live-action actor of all time as of 2021.

Jackson had a small part in Miloš Forman's film Ragtime (1981). His other early film appearances were minor roles in films such as Coming to America (1988), Do the Right Thing (1989), Goodfellas (1990), and The Exorcist III (1990). His breakthrough role was the crack-addict Gator in Spike Lee's Jungle Fever (1991), for which Jackson won a special jury prize for best supporting actor at the Cannes Film Festival. He appeared in Jurassic Park in 1993 and, a year later, starred in the Quentin Tarantino-directed Pulp Fiction. For the latter film, Jackson won the BAFTA Award for Best Actor in a Supporting Role and received nominations for the Academy Award for Best Supporting Actor and a Golden Globe Award. In 1994, he was also nominated for a Golden Globe Award for Best Actor for his performance in Against the Wall. The following year, he starred opposite Bruce Willis in Die Hard with a Vengeance. Jackson's performance in A Time to Kill (1996) garnered him a Golden Globe nomination for Best Supporting Actor. He then collaborated with Tarantino on Jackie Brown (1997), for which he received a Golden Globe nomination. In 1999, he starred in the science fiction horror film Deep Blue Sea.

Beginning with The Phantom Menace in 1999, Jackson played Mace Windu in the Star Wars prequel trilogy, and he has reprised the role in later entries. In 2000, he had a leading role in the remake of Shaft. Also that year, he starred opposite Bruce Willis in the M. Night Shyamalan-directed Unbreakable. He returned to this role in Glass (2019). In 2004, he voiced Frozone in Pixar's The Incredibles and Officer Frank Tenpenny in the video game Grand Theft Auto: San Andreas. Jackson first appeared as Nick Fury in Iron Man (2008) and has reprised the role in ten other Marvel Cinematic Universe films. In 2011, he starred opposite Tommy Lee Jones in The Sunset Limited, an adaptation of Cormac McCarthy's play of the same name. The following year, he collaborated with Tarantino again on Django Unchained. He starred opposite Kurt Russell in The Hateful Eight (2015), also directed by Tarantino. In the latter half of the 2010s, Jackson starred in blockbuster films such as Kingsman: The Secret Service (2015) and Kong: Skull Island (2017).

Jackson has appeared in three stage productions. In the early 1980s, he performed in Off-Broadway productions of Mother Courage and Her Children and A Soldier's Play. From 2011 to 2012, he portrayed Martin Luther King Jr. in The Mountaintop on Broadway. Jackson has also lent his voice to six video games and two audiobooks. He is scheduled to receive an Academy Honorary Award in 2022.

Film

Television

Theater

Video games

Audiobooks

See also
List of awards and nominations received by Samuel L. Jackson

Notes and references

Notes

References

External links
 Samuel L. Jackson on IMDb

Male actor filmographies
American filmographies